or  is a lake in Målselv Municipality in Troms og Finnmark county, Norway. It is part of the Rostaelva river system which empties into the great Målselva river.

See also
List of lakes in Norway

References

Målselv
Lakes of Troms og Finnmark